(Bernardinelli–Bernstein), simply known as  or Comet Bernardinelli–Bernstein (nicknamed BB), is a large Oort cloud comet discovered by astronomers Pedro Bernardinelli and Gary Bernstein in archival images from the Dark Energy Survey. With a nucleus diameter of at least , it is the largest Oort cloud comet known. It is approaching the Sun and will reach its perihelion of 10.9 AU (just outside of Saturn's orbit) in January 2031. It will not be visible to the naked eye because it will not enter the inner Solar System.

Observational history

Discovery 

 was discovered by astronomers Pedro Bernardinelli and Gary Bernstein in an algorithm-assisted search for slowly-moving trans-Neptunian objects, in archival images from the Dark Energy Survey (DES) at Cerro Tololo Inter-American Observatory. It was detected at the 22nd apparent magnitude in 42 DES images spanning 10 October 2014 to 26 November 2018. The long observation arc by the DES images revealed that the object was on a near-parabolic trajectory inbound towards the Solar System, implying a cometary origin from the Oort cloud, despite the object's apparently asteroidal (point-like) appearance in the images. The object's relatively high brightness from its distance indicated that its diameter must be on the order of —an exceptionally large size for an object of cometary origin.

The discovery was announced by the Minor Planet Center on 19 June 2021, and the object was given the minor planet provisional designation . The object attracted significant attention from astronomers worldwide: astronomers made follow-up observations and found several precoveries within days of the announcement.

Cometary activity 

The comet was found to be one magnitude brighter than predicted in their observations, with a slightly asymmetric coma up to 15 arcseconds in width. The detection of cometary activity was confirmed by the Minor Planet Center and the comet was formally named  (Bernardinelli–Bernstein) on 24 June 2021.

Between the 2018 and 2020 TESS observation epochs, the comet's brightness had significantly increased by 1.5 magnitudes, likely as a result of continuous activity rather than a spontaneous outburst.

Reexamination of other telescope datasets have also identified a diffuse and distinctly asymmetric coma in DES images beginning from 2017 (at 25.1 AU) and Pan-STARRS 1 images beginning from 2019 (at 22.6 AU). 's coma brightness has been growing exponentially since 2017, while the comet's overall brightness had remained steady in 2014–2018, hinting that activity may have well begun prior to the comet's discovery at 29.0 AU. The observation of cometary activity from such large heliocentric distances is rare: only three other comets, Comet Hale–Bopp (27.2 AU outbound), C/2010 U3 (Boattini) (25.8 AU inbound), and C/2017 K2 (PanSTARRS) (24.0 AU inbound), have been observed to exhibit activity at heliocentric distances greater than 20 AU. ,  holds the record for the greatest distance at which a comet has been discovered in the Solar System.

 was observed by the Hubble Space Telescope in January, March, July, August, and October 2022.

2021 outburst 
It brightened by 0.65 magnitudes compared to images taken earlier that day, and reached an apparent magnitude of 18.9. Calculations based on this brightening indicate that  of dust was ejected during the outburst. The comet's brightness has since faded back down to the 19th magnitude by December 2021.

Occultations 
Rigorous computations of 's orbit and ephemeris have identified few potential occultation events by the comet from 2021–2025, during which the comet would pass in front of a bright star and briefly block out the star's light. Observing these occultation events would allow for opportunities to make precise measurements of the comet's size and position, as well as search for surrounding dust and possible satellites. The first attempt at observing one of those occultations was made from Australia and New Zealand on 19 September 2021, but was unsuccessful due to poor weather conditions.

Visibility 

The evolution of its cometary activity will soon be monitored by the upcoming Vera C. Rubin Observatory starting 2023. Once at perihelion, the comet is not expected to get brighter than Pluto (mag 13–16) and is more likely to reach the brightness of Pluto's moon Charon (mag 16.8) as the comet does not enter the inner Solar System where comets become notably more active. Even if it reaches the magnitude of Pluto, it will require about a  telescope to be visually seen.

Nucleus properties

Size and mass 

The ALMA measurements have not ruled out the possibility of a dust coma contaminating up to 24% of the nucleus's thermal emission, so the actual diameter may well be smaller.

Media outlets have dubbed  a "mega-comet", with some even purporting it to be a possible dwarf planet. However,  lies far below the  diameter threshold for hydrostatic equilibrium; it cannot be a dwarf planet as it is most likely not massive enough to have become spherical through its own gravity. Additionally, comet nuclei up to the size of  typically have low bulk densities below , indicative of highly porous interior structures in contrast to the solid and differentiated interiors of dwarf planets.

Albedo and color 

For the maximum estimated diameter (137 km), the minimum albedo of the nucleus would be . 's low albedo is characteristic of small comet nuclei from both short- and long-period populations, suggesting a lack of correlation between albedo, nucleus size, and orbit type in Solar System comets. The low albedos of cometary nuclei are generally attributed to the deposition of carbon, organic compounds, and sulfides produced by cosmic rays dissociating molecules on the nucleus's surface.

Optical observations of  during its inbound passage show that its nucleus appears more reflective at longer wavelengths, indicating a moderately red color similar to (albeit slightly less red than) most long-period comets. The albedo and color of 's nucleus are expected to change over time due to cometary activity, especially after perihelion passage when temperatures decrease; its nucleus is massive enough to gravitationally recapture deposited icy ejecta back onto its surface, similar to what has been observed on Comet Hale–Bopp after its perihelion.

Rotation 
The rotation period of 's nucleus is disputed, as some studies found no significant rotational periodicity in its light curve. Continuous observations by TESS in 2018 and 2020 did not detect any periodicity, placing an upper limit of 0.3 magnitudes for the nucleus's amplitude of variability. In 2021, Bernardinelli and collaborators from the DES analyzed various ground-based telescope datasets from 2018 and earlier, finding an apparent nucleus variability of 0.2 magnitudes, but no periodicity due to sparse data. Bernardinelli et al. do not rule out other factors such as small dust outbursts that may contribute to this apparent variability, leaving room for the possibility that the nucleus's true rotational variability may be even less than 0.2 magnitudes. In April 2022, astronomers Ignacio Ferrin and A. Ferrero reported a nucleus rotation period of  days, based on an analysis of 's long-term light curve behavior in observations from the Minor Planet Center's database. Ferrin and Ferrero found a nucleus light curve amplitude of  magnitudes, incongruous with findings by TESS and Bernardinelli et al.

Cometary properties 
The exponential brightening of 's coma at 20–25 AU is consistent with it being generated by sublimating carbon dioxide (CO2) or ammonia (NH3) ices from the nucleus's surface.

Orbit and origin 

 came from the Oort cloud and has been inside of the orbit of Neptune (29.9 AU) since March 2014 and passed inside the orbit of Uranus (18.3 AU) in September 2022. The time of perihelion has been well-known since June 2021. The current 3-sigma uncertainty in the comet's distance from the Sun is ±35,000 km.

The inbound and outbound orbital period of an Oort cloud comet are never exactly the same as the orbit changes as a result of planetary perturbations. For an Oort cloud comet an orbit defined while inside of the planetary region can produce results that are misleading. Therefore, the inbound and outbound orbits should be computed before entering the planetary region and after leaving the planetary region. It will cross the ecliptic plane on 8 August 2033 when it is outbound  from the Sun. The object is only very loosely bound to the Sun and subject to perturbations by the galactic tide while in the Oort cloud.

This adds further evidence to  being a dynamically new comet.

Exploration 
The European Space Agency's upcoming Comet Interceptor mission, which will launch in 2029 and make a flyby of a long-period comet within Earth's orbit, will not be able to reach  due to its large perihelion distance.

According to a 2021 study by the Initiative for Interstellar Studies, a future flyby mission with a direct, low-energy trajectory to  can have yearly optimal launch windows between September and October throughout 2022–2029, for a maximum delta-v of 20 km/s at Earth. Alternatively, a flyby trajectory to  using a combined gravity assist and Oberth maneuver at Jupiter can have feasible launch dates from 2020–2027 and 2034–2037. A launch within the latter window could utilize an Earth flyby to Jupiter after completing a 1:1 Earth resonant orbit, which would significantly reduce the characteristic energy at Earth launch and allow for target arrival above the ecliptic. A flyby trajectory using consecutive gravity assists and orbital resonances from the inner planets is also possible, but the most optimal encounter combinations provide launch dates up to 2028, for a late 2033 arrival time.

A rendezvous trajectory to  has been considered, although the comet's nearly-perpendicular orbit renders any direct rendezvous trajectory from the ecliptic unfeasible. Nonetheless, a rendezvous with  can be performed with a Jupiter gravity assist after the comet has crossed the ecliptic, with optimal launch dates in 2030–2034 and flight durations around 14–15 years.

See also 
 List of Solar System objects by greatest aphelion

Notes

References

External links 

 C/2014 UN271 (Bernardinelli–Bernstein) – comet catalog page by Seiichi Yoshida, updated 5 February 2022
 Giant Comet Found in Outer Solar System by Dark Energy Survey – NOIRLab press release, 25 June 2021
 
 

Non-periodic comets
Discoveries by Gary M. Bernstein
20141020
Oort cloud